Comey is a surname of Irish or Scottish origin. The famous Irish genealogists Edward MacLysaght states Comey is a family small in numbers meaning not one of the larger clan and is from North Leinster. The name in Irish is Mac Giolla Choimdheadh translated as "son/descendant of servant of the Lord God" indicating a hereditary ecclesiastical family. The name broken down is; Mac means son of or descendant of, Giolla meaning servant and Choimdheadh is Lord God.  A name associated with Breifne, Kingdom of Breifne.

Edward MacLysaght (6 November 1887 – 4 March 1986) was one of the foremost genealogists of twentieth century Ireland. His numerous books on Irish surnames built upon the work of Rev. Patrick Woulfe's Irish Names and Surnames (1923) and made him well known to all those researching their family past.

In the Irish Language "Mac Giolla Choimdheadh Comey: annamh: Cabhán & rl. Clann de chuid Bhreifne. Téarma liteartha don Tiarna Dia is ea Coimdhe", meaning Mac Giolla Choimdheadh or Comey small in number: Cavan and so on. A family from the Kingdom of Breifne.  Coimdhe literally means Lord God.

Notable people with the surname include:

 James Comey (born 1960), American director of the FBI, 2013–2017
 Rachel Comey, American fashion designer
 Stephen Comey (born 1963), British-Australian actor

Anglicised Irish-language surnames